Dalophia is a genus of amphisbaenians in the family Amphisbaenidae, commonly known as worm lizards. Seven species are placed in this genus.

Species
There are seven recognized species:
Dalophia angolensis 
Dalophia ellenbergeri 
Dalophia gigantea 
Dalophia longicauda 
Dalophia luluae 
Dalophia pistillum  - pestle-tailed worm lizard
Dalophia welwitschii  

Nota bene: A binomial authority in parentheses indicates that the species was originally described in a genus other than Dalophia.

References

Further reading

Gans C (2005). "Checklist and Bibliography of the Amphisbaenia of the World". Bulletin of the American Museum of Natural History (289): 1–130.
Gray JE (1865). "A Revision of the Genera and Species of Amphisbænians, with the Descriptions of some New Species now in the Collection of the British Museum". Proceedings of the Zoological Society of London 1865: 442–455. (Dalophia, new genus, pp. 454–455).

 
Lizard genera
Taxa named by John Edward Gray